Smetona is the masculine form of a Lithuanian family name. Its feminine forms  are: Smetonienė (married woman or widow) and Smetonaitė (unmarried woman).

The surname may refer to:

Antanas Smetona (1874–1944), Lithuanian intellectual and journalist

See also
Lithuanian warship Prezidentas Smetona

Lithuanian-language surnames